Vladimir Ilich Tarasov (born 7 February 1939 in Moscow) is a Russian animator and animation director. He is best known for his Soviet-era science fiction short films, such as The Pass, Contact and Contract, among others.

Biography

He studied at the Moscow Polygraphic Institute (Moscow Fine Art and Design University) from 1965 until 1970. Since 1957 he worked at the studio Soyuzmultfilm first as an animator and then as an art director with V. Y. Bordzilovsky, M. A. Botov and V. D. Degtyaryov and then from 1970 till 1991 as the director. He is one of the founders of "Studio 13" and worked there as a director during the period 1991–1994. He was also an organizer and founder of the film schools in Zee Institute of Creative Art (ZICA) in India (also a teacher and director in the period from 1995 to 1999) and Tarbiat Modares University in Iran from 2000 till 2004.

He has worked with artists M. S. Zherebchevsky, V. Peskov, N. I. Koshkin, S. P. Tyunin and others.
He received the title Honored Artist of the RSFSR in 1989.

Work 
 Cowboys in the City, 1973
 Mirror of Time, (Зеркало времени), 1976
 Forward March, Time!, (Вперёд, Время!), 1977
 Contact (Контакт), 1978
 Shooting Range (Тир), 1979
 The Return (Возвращение), 1980
 Button (Пуговица), 1982
 Contract (Контракт), 1985
 The Pass (Перевал), 1988
 The 17th and 18th episodes of Nu, pogodi! (Ну, погоди!) (1993–94)

References

External links 

1939 births
Russian animators
Russian animated film directors
Living people
Soviet animators